Here follows a list of notable people associated with Kenyon College in Gambier, Ohio. This list includes the college's notable alumni, organized by their fields of endeavor, in addition to notable members of its faculty and a complete chronological list of the presidents of the college.

Distinguished graduates

Academia

Activism

Law

Literature and journalism

Military

Performing arts

Philanthropy

Politics

Religion

Sciences

Sports

Visual arts

Notable faculty members
 Chauncey Colton, Homiletics 
 Virgil Aldrich, Philosophy
 Robert O. Fink, Classics
 Bruce Haywood, German; Provost
 Jed Hoyer, Kenyon Baseball Coach; Executive Vice President and General Manager, Chicago Cubs
 Lewis Hyde, English
 Randall Jarrell, English
 P. F. Kluge, English
 Perry Lentz, English
 Robie Macauley, English
 Wendy MacLeod, Theater
 George E. McCarthy, Sociology
 Otto Nikodym, Mathematics
 Paul Radin, Anthropology
 John Crowe Ransom, English
 Charles Ritcheson, History
 Richard G. Salomon, History
 Benjamin Schumacher, Physics
 Joan Slonczewski, Biology
 Anna Sun, Sociology, Asian Studies
 Denham Sutcliffe, English
 Allen Tate, English

Visiting faculty
 John Kinsella, English
 Claire Messud, English
 Barry Unsworth, English
 Katharine Weber, English
 James Wood, English

Presidents of the college

 Philander Chase (1825–1831)
 Charles Pettit McIlvaine (1832–1840)
 David Bates Douglass (1840–1844)
 Samuel Fuller (acting, 1844–1845)
 Sherlock A. Bronson (1845–1850)
 Thomas M. Smith (1850–1854)
 Lorin Andrews (1854–1861)
 Benjamin L. Lang (acting, 1861–1863)
 Charles Short (1863–1867)
 James Kent Stone (1867–1868)
 Eli Todd Tappan (1868–1875)
 Edward C. Benson (acting, 1875–1876)
 William B. Bodine (1876–1891)
 Theodore Sterling (1891–1896)
 William Foster Peirce (1896–1937)
 Gordon Keith Chalmers (1937–1956)
 Frank E. Bailey (acting, 1956–1957)
 F. Edward Lund (1957–1968)
 William G. Caples (1968–1975)
 Philip H. Jordan Jr. (1975–1995)
 Reed S. Browning (acting, 1989)
 Robert A. Oden Jr. (1995–2002)
 Ronald A. Sharp (acting, 2002–2003)
 S. Georgia Nugent (2003–2013)
 Sean M. Decatur (2013–2022)
 Jeff Bowman (acting, 2022–2023)

References

Kenyon College people